PQI may refer to:

 Presque Isle International Airport, IATA airport code
 Print Quality Improvement, data exchange format of Advanced Photo System
 Predictive Quantities Indicator, used for College and university rankings
 Pittsburgh Quantum Institute

See also
 PQ1 (disambiguation)
 PQL (disambiguation)